Broadminded is a 1931 American Pre-Code comedy film directed by Mervyn LeRoy and starring Joe E. Brown.

Plot
Collier Jr. plays Jack, a New York City playboy sent to California to straighten himself out after a string of scandals. His father pairs him with his "responsible" cousin, Ossie, who he doesnt realize is even more of a partier than his son is, and the two get mixed up with two pretty girls while driving west. Jack decides to marry his girl, but when his ex fiancé shows up and threatens to reveal his past to her, Ossie comes up with a plan to save his relationship.

Cast
Joe E. Brown - Ossie Simpson
Ona Munson - Constance Palmer
William Collier Jr. - Jack Hackett
Marjorie White - Penny Packer
Holmes Herbert - John J. Hackett Sr.
Margaret Livingston - Mabel Robinson
Thelma Todd - Gertie Gardner
Bela Lugosi - Pancho Arango

Production
Filming took place in March 1931. The movie was made a few months after Lugosi's hit Dracula was released.

Preservation status
A print is preserved in the Library of Congress collection.

References

External links

1931 films
1931 comedy films
American black-and-white films
American comedy films
1930s English-language films
Films directed by Mervyn LeRoy
Films set in Pasadena, California
First National Pictures films
1930s American films